Froville is a commune in the Meurthe-et-Moselle department in north-eastern France.

It is noted for its romanesque church, with a gothic cloister, part of which was moved to the Cloisters Museum of New York City.

Froville hosts a festival of sacred and baroque music.

See also
Communes of the Meurthe-et-Moselle department

References

External links

 Froville festival of sacred and baroque music

Communes of Meurthe-et-Moselle